Wyoming Highway 175 (WYO 175) is a short  spur route located in northeastern Hot Springs county that serves the small town of Kirby.

Route description
Wyoming Highway 175 begins its western end at US Route 20/Wyoming Highway 789 just outside Kirby. Highway 175 travels due east for only  before ending as it enters the town limits of Kirby. The roadway continues as West Main Street.

Major intersections

References

External links 

Wyoming State Routes 100-199
WYO 175 - US 20/WYO 789 to Kirby

Transportation in Hot Springs County, Wyoming
175
State highways in the United States shorter than one mile